Vladimir Kabranov (born 22 September 1986) is a Bulgarian footballer who plays for Vihren Sandanski as an attacking midfielder.

Career
Vladimir Kabranov is a son of Kostadin Kabranov - shooter number one of Belasitsa for all time in Bulgarian first division. Vladimir was raised in Belasitsa's youth teams. As an 18-year old in 2004 he signed his first professional contract and made his debut for the first team in the A PFG. In June 2009 he signed a contract with FC Vihren Sandanski.

References

External links
 Profile at Belasitsa Official site

1986 births
Living people
Bulgarian footballers
Association football midfielders
First Professional Football League (Bulgaria) players
PFC Belasitsa Petrich players
OFC Vihren Sandanski players
FC Bansko players
People from Petrich
Sportspeople from Blagoevgrad Province
21st-century Bulgarian people